The 2015 President of the Chamber of Deputies of Brazil election took place on 1 February 2015, following the opening of the 55th Legislature of the National Congress. President Henrique Eduardo Alves (PMDB-RN) wasn't reelect federal deputy, but his caucus mate, Eduardo Cunha (PMDB-RJ), was chosen as the party's candidate.
Cunha received 267 votes, over the majority of the Chamber, to become its president. PT leader Arlindo Chinaglia (PT-SP) garnered 136, and 100 votes to Júlio Delgado (PSB-MG), 8 to Chico Alencar (PSOL-RJ), and 2 blank votes.

Deputy Miro Teixeira (PROS-RJ) presided the session and sworned in all the 513 deputies and the elect President of the Chamber.

Formal voting

References

2015 elections in Brazil
Elections in Brazil
President of the Chamber of Deputies of Brazil elections